The Geological Survey of Western Australia is an authority within the Department of Mines and Petroleum  of the Government of Western Australia that is responsible for surveying and exploration of Western Australia's geological resources.  
The department provides information to industry, technical support and professional guidance to government on geology, mining and petroleum resources.

Historically the Survey has existed under the various names that the Mines Department has been ascribed by various governments.

Mapping 
The mapping by the survey between 1894 and 2015 is documented in Riganti and others with examples of state maps: -

 1894 - Woodward Map

 1916 - Brockman Map

 1919 and 1920

 1933

 1950

 1966

 1973

 1979
 1988 -- centenary of GSWA

 1998

 2015 Map
Also some sections have moved between the survey and other departments. For example, the hydrogeology section was moved to the Waters and Rivers Commission in 1996.

Publications
 Annual Reports
 Western Australia Atlas of mineral deposits and petroleum fields

See also
 Geological Survey of South Australia

Notes

External links
 Geological Survey

1886 establishments in Australia
Western Australia
Statutory agencies of Western Australia